Jonathan Eduardo Rebolledo Ardiles (born 22 October 1991) is a Chilean footballer.

Honours

Club
Deportes Iquique
 Copa Chile (2): Runner–up 2009, 2010
 Primera B: 2010

External links
 Jonathan Rebolledo at Football-Lineups
 
 

1991 births
Living people
People from Iquique
Chilean footballers
Deportes Iquique footballers
Puerto Montt footballers
Chilean Primera División players
Primera B de Chile players
Association football midfielders